West Walnut Street Commercial Historic District is a national historic district located in Springfield, Missouri, United States. The district encompasses 14 contributing buildings in a commercial section of Springfield. The district developed between about 1888 and 1951, and includes representative examples of Italianate commercial architecture.  Notable buildings include the Diffenderffer Building (1906), the Koenigsbruk and Boehmer Building (c. 1888), and the Grand Hotel / Springfield Seed Co. Building (c. 1920).

It was added to the National Register of Historic Places in 2002.

References

Historic districts on the National Register of Historic Places in Missouri
Italianate architecture in Missouri
Buildings and structures in Springfield, Missouri
National Register of Historic Places in Greene County, Missouri